Bebearia denticula is a butterfly in the family Nymphalidae. It is found in Nigeria.

References

Butterflies described in 2000
denticula
Endemic fauna of Nigeria
Butterflies of Africa